Busly liaciać is a Belarusian opposition resistance group founded on 13 November 2020 and fighting against the Alexander Lukashenko government. Included together with the Cyber Partisans in the association "Supraciŭ"

Among the actions of the movement there are both absolutely harmless (like street art or flash mobs), and actions in the format of small sabotage. "Busly" took responsibility for the destruction of dozens of CCTV cameras, damage to vehicles and property of the security forces, blocking the railway.

A well-known action that is associated with the Busly Lyatsyats group is an attack on the base of the Minsk OMON at the end of September 2021. According to the report of the group, at night, the Chorny Busel group, using a drone, dropped two 5-litre containers of incendiary mixture from a great height onto the riot police base in Uručča. The community claims that loud pops were heard and flashes were seen, causing people in neighboring houses to wake up. Also, the "beads" published a video from the drone.

The Ministry of Internal Affairs then did not comment on the information about the attack on the OMON base. But later, in October, the Prosecutor General's Office indirectly confirmed the fact of the attack, admitting that in September 2021 "there was an act of terrorism using UAVs."

In October 2021, the Ministry of Internal Affairs of Belarus recognized the "Busly liaciać" Telegram channel and the "Busly liaciać chat" chat as an extremist formation, warning that subscription and active participation in it entail criminal liability.

The organization "Supraciŭ" and its members the initiatives "Cyber Partisans", "DNS", "Busly liaciać" – by the decision of the Supreme Court of the Republic of Belarus of 1 December 2021, were recognized as terrorist and banned on the territory of the Republic of Belarus. The representative of the prosecutor's office explained that "since the spring of 2021, using Telegram channels and Telegram chats, this community has been discussing, planning and promoting terrorist acts, namely arson, explosions of buildings and vehicles."

Since the beginning of the 2022 Russian invasion of Ukraine, the movement has carried out acts of sabotage on both Belarusian and Russian railways.

See also 

 Cyber Partisans
 Community of Railway Workers of Belarus

References 

2020–2021 Belarusian protests
Belarusian opposition
Resistance during the 2022 Russian invasion of Ukraine